Fußball-Club 08 Homburg or simply FC Homburg is a German association football club based in Homburg, Saarland, that competes in the Regionalliga Südwest. The club was founded on 15 June 1908 as Fussball Club Homburg by a group of seventeen young men at the local Hohenburg pub.

History 
In February 1913 they were renamed Fussballverein Homburg and went on to take the local championship that season. By the mid-1920s the side was playing second-division football, but folded on 27 August 1936. A new multi-sport club known as VfL Homburg was formed 5 March 1937 out of a group of local sides that included Turnverein 1878 Homburg, Schwimmverein Homburg, Kraftsportverein Homburg, Boxclub Homburg, Tennis-Club Homburg, as well as the former membership of the defunct FV. The footballers again took up play in second-tier competition and failed in two attempts (1938, 1941) to win their way through the regional promotion playoff to the first division Gauliga Südwest.

After World War II, Allied occupation authorities dissolved all types of associations in Germany, including football clubs. The club was soon re-constituted as Sportverein Homburg and captured a division championship in the Amateurliga Saarland (III) in 1948 before resuming the name FC Homburg in January 1949.

The Saarland was occupied by the French who made various efforts to see the state become independent of Germany or join France. In sport this was manifested as separate 1952 Olympic and 1954 World Cup teams for Saarland, the establishment of a short-lived football league for the state, and the German club 1. FC Saarbrücken playing in the French second division. Homburg played in the Saarland Ehrenliga from 1949 to 1951 as FC Homburg-Saar. By the time of the 1951–52 season the return of German teams to the German Football Association had been negotiated: the Ehrenliga faded away and by 1956 the independent Saarland Fussball Bund had re-joined the DFB.

A second Amateurliga Saarland title in 1957 advanced FC to the 2. Liga-Südwest (II) and in December of that year they adopted the name FC 08 Homburg/Saar. The club was relegated to the Amateurliga in 1960 which had become a fourth-tier circuit by 1963.

In the late 1970s the team advanced to the quarter finals of the DFB-Pokal on two occasions, and on into the early 1980s moved frequently between third- and fourth-tier play. Then, in the second half of the decade, they enjoyed their greatest success. They played their way back to the second division and on into the Bundesliga in 1986. Homburg played two seasons there, were relegated, and returned for one final Bundesliga season in 1989–90 before beginning a gradual descent which would lead them to Oberliga Südwest (IV) where they play today.

The club had a moment of glory in 1991 when it beat FC Bayern Munich in Munich 4–2 after extra time in the first round of the 1991–92 DFB-Pokal. They were relegated from the 2. Bundesliga after the 1994–95 season.

Along the way the club had a couple of misadventures. In 1988, the DFB prohibited the team from wearing the sponsorship logo of a condom manufacturer on ethical and moral grounds. In 1998, they entered into an agreement with 1. FC Saarbrücken to loan players to that team to help ease Homburgs financial pinch. Despite this, in 1999, the club had a brush with bankruptcy that led to their being denied a license to play in the Regionalliga West/Südwest (III) and demotion to the Oberliga Südwest (IV). The club qualified for the 2006–07 German Cup and went out in the first round 1–2 to Bundesliga side VfL Bochum. Homburg was finally promoted to Regionalliga West after finishing atop the Oberliga Südwest ahead of FK Pirmasens on a goal differential of plus 2 in the 2009–10 season. Their Regionalliga cameo ended with a 17th place finish and a return to fifth tier play. Homburg immediately bounced back by capturing the Oberliga Südwest title and qualifying for the Regionalliga Südwest (IV) for 2012–13.

 Honours 
The club's honours:

 League 
 German amateur championship Champions: 1983
 2. Bundesliga (II)
 Champions: 1986
 Runners-up: 1989
 Oberliga Südwest (III/V)
 Champions: 1982, 1984, 2010, 2012
 Amateurliga Saarland (III)
 Champions: 1948, 1957, 1966

 Cup 
 Saarland Cup' (Tiers III-VII)
 Winners: 1983, 2001, 2006, 2008, 2014, 2016
 Runners-up: 1996, 1998, 2003, 2007, 2015, 2020, 2022

Recent managers 
Recent managers of the club:

Recent seasons 
The recent season-by-season performance of the club:

 With the introduction of the Regionalligas in 1994 and the 3. Liga in 2008 as the new third tier, below the 2. Bundesliga, all leagues below dropped one tier. In 2012, the number of Regionalligas was increased from three to five with all Regionalliga West clubs from the Saarland and Rhineland-Palatinate entering the new Regionalliga Südwest.

Key

Current squad

References

External links 
  
 The Abseits Guide to German Soccer
 FC 08 Homburg at Weltfussball.de
 Das deutsche Fußball-Archiv historical German domestic league tables 

 
Football clubs in Germany
Football clubs in Saarland
Association football clubs established in 1908
1908 establishments in Germany
Homburg, Saarland
Bundesliga clubs
2. Bundesliga clubs